Yanis Huang is a Chinese songwriter and producer. He works in arrangement, harmonizing, production, movie soundtracks, live performances, and concert production. He won awards, such as “Best Arrangement of the Year” in Beijing Pop Music Awards, "Best Original Song” in Golden Horse Awards, and "Song of the Year” in Golden Melody Awards.

Career 
He works as an exclusive writer for Warner Chappell Music. He has arranged and produced the works of singers including Jay Chou, Jeff Chang, Wilber Pan, Tiger Huang, Angela Chang, Fahrenheit, Power Station, Alex To, Elva Hsiao, Andrew Tan, Ricky Hsiao, Ariel Lin, Vivian Hsu, Where Chou, Cyndi Wang, and Weibird. His soundtracks include Rhythm of The Rain 聽見下雨的聲音, The Rooftop 天台, The Harbor 港都, L-O-V-E 愛到底 - 華山 22, and Your Name Engraved Herein 刻在我心底的名字. Huang and Jay Chou are friends and work partners. Chou makes requests or ask for feedback directly, and the two exchange ideas. Jay Chou's “Rice Field 稻香”, which won “Song of the Year” in the 20th Golden Melody Awards was arranged by Huang.

Artistry 
Huang had many discussions with the movie director during the arrangement of Your Name Engraved Herein 刻在我心底的名字. He read the film treatment carefully, made demos, and revised it based on feedback. He also collaborated with Chris Hou on the film soundtrack of Your Name Engraved Herein 刻在我心底的名字.

Huang shared in an interview that his songs had a lot to do with the songs he usually listens to. He recommends that young music talents should listen to a wide range of music, and practice developing melodies while watching movies or reading books.

Works

Arrangements

Composition

Production

Awards

References 

Year of birth missing (living people)
Living people
Chinese songwriters
Chinese producers